Cole Park, Tezpur is a very picturesque park near the centre of Tezpur. It has recently been renamed as Chitralekha Udyan although both names are synonymous. The name is after a famous character in Agnigarh Aniruddha-Usha love story  It has had a long tradition of hosting painting/drawing competitions for the nearby schools due to the various features it possesses.
A replica of the  famous Bhomoraguri inscription which recorded the ancient plans to build a bridge across the Brahmaputra where the current Kolia Bhomora Setu exists has been created in this park for public viewing. The park has facilities for paddle boating on the pond. It recently has added ' Bumping Cars ' to its list of amusements . Primary viewing attractions for children is a jet-fighter model Valiant MIG 21 the first supersonic aircraft for the Indian Air Force capable of travelling at Mach 2 ( with engines removed and fixed ) and a large concrete-made map of India ( states as before year 2000). 

There is a water feature in the form of a lake where small rowing and paddle boats are allowed. 

Tezpur